Sanananda is a village on the coast of Oro Province, Papua New Guinea.

History
Sanananda was occupied by the Imperial Japanese in 1942 during World War II and became a heavily fortified defensive area. It was liberated by the Australian Army and US Army on 18 January 1943 during the Battle of Buna-Gona.

References

Pacific War Wrecks
 Sanananda

Populated places in Oro Province